Moving Pictures is the debut album led by saxophonist Ravi Coltrane which was recorded in 1997 and released on the RCA/BMG label.

Reception

Stephen Thomas Erlewine of AllMusic stated, "Coltrane achieves a welcoming, relaxed atmosphere on his first session. It may not offer anything new, but Moving Pictures is a promising debut from a young saxophonist who may have a lot to offer on his own terms". In The Washington Post, Geoffrey Himes noted "Neither as revolutionary as his father's late recordings nor as conservative as the retro-hard-bop discs released by most youngsters, Coltrane's debut is an impressive, distinctly personal project". All About Jazz said "The album develops slowly; many songs blend into each other without a pause. Some of the early numbers sound a little meandering ... The album's second half is definitely worth hearing, and certainly gives an indication of things to come. It wouldn't surprise me if the next album is better - maybe much better. The talent is there"

Track listing 
All compositions by Ravi Coltrane except where noted
 "Interlude - Thursday" – 2:36
 "Narcine" – 9:20
 "Tones for Jobe Kain" – 7:20
 "In Three for Thee" – 5:06
 "Peace" (Horace Silver) – 5:39
 "Search for Peace" (McCoy Tyner) – 7:10
 "Mixed Media" – 8:22
 "High Windows" – 6:34
 "Inner Urge" (Joe Henderson) – 7:50
 "When You Dream" (Wayne Shorter, Edgy Lee) – 4:39
 "Outerlude - Still Thursday" – 2:50

Personnel 
Ravi Coltrane – tenor saxophone, soprano saxophone
Michael Cain – piano 
Lonnie Plaxico - bass
Jeff "Tain" Watts  – drums
Ralph Alessi – trumpet (tracks 1, 3, 7 & 11)
Steve Coleman – alto saxophone (tracks 9 & 11)
Ancient Vibrations: (tracks 1, 6 & 11)
Junior Gabu Wedderburn – lead djembe
Jeremiah McFarlane – djembe
Clyde Wedderburn – djun djun

References 

1998 debut albums
Ravi Coltrane albums
RCA Records albums
Bertelsmann Music Group albums